Sailor is the second studio album by American rock group Steve Miller Band, released in October 1968 by Capitol Records. It was recorded in Los Angeles, California, and was produced by the band along with Glyn Johns.  The album was the last Steve Miller Band album to feature contributions by original members Boz Scaggs and Jim Peterman.  

The album reached number 24 on the Billboard 200 album chart. and number 27 in Canada.  It was voted number 353 in the third edition of Colin Larkin's All Time Top 1000 Albums (2000).

Track listing

References

External links

Steve Miller Band albums
1968 albums
Albums produced by Glyn Johns
Capitol Records albums